Greg Dear (born 17 April 1963) is a former Australian rules footballer who played for Hawthorn and Richmond in the VFL/AFL.

A ruckman, Dear was a member of the strong Hawthorn sides of the late 1980s and a premiership player in 1986, 1988 and 1989. He could have had a fourth in 1991 but missed the entire season
due to a serious knee injury. In 1994 he was traded to Richmond where he finished his career.

Dear had joined the senior Hawthorn side in 1985 after impressing in the reserve grade, winning the Gardiner Medal for the league's best reserve player. The following season he was selected in the VFL Team of the Year as first ruckman and he later went on to represent Victoria at the State of Origin. 

Greg Dear is the brother of fellow Hawk Paul Dear.

External links

Profile at Hawksheadquarters.com
 

1963 births
Living people
Hawthorn Football Club players
Hawthorn Football Club Premiership players
Richmond Football Club players
Victorian State of Origin players
Australian rules footballers from Victoria (Australia)
Three-time VFL/AFL Premiership players